In chemistry, phosphorochloridites are a class of organophosphorus compound with the formula (RO)2PCl (R = organic substituent).  They are pyramidal in shape, akin to regular phosphites (P(OR)3).  They are usually colorless and sensitive toward hydrolysis and, to some extent, oxidation to the corresponding phosphorochloridates ((RO)2P(O)Cl).

Synthesis and reactions

Phosphorochloridites are produced by partial alcoholysis of phosphorus trichloride, which proceeds stepwise:
PCl3  +  ROH  →   HCl  +  (RO)PCl2 (phosphochloridite)
(RO)PCl2  +  ROH  →   HCl  +  (RO)2PCl (phosphodichloridite)
(RO)2PCl  +  ROH  →   HCl  +  (RO)3P (phosphite)
These reactions are readily controlled with aromatic diols, such as binaphthol and 2,2'-biphenol.

Phosphorochloridites are precursors to diphosphite ligands.  When combined with rhodium precursors such as Rh(acac)(CO)2, these diphosphite ligands afford catalysts that are used industrially for the hydroformylation of alkenes. it and related ligands have become popular in hydroformylation catalysis.

References

 
Functional groups
Chlorides
Phosphorus(III) compounds